Jouko Olavi Keskinen (born 22 October 1950, in Helsinki) is a Finnish actor. He is famous for the Finnish soap opera Salatut elämät, where he played Jukka Salin from 1999 to 2004.

External links

References 

Finnish male actors
1950 births
Living people